Bostonnais may refer to:

Place names 
 Little Bostonnais River, La Tuque (City), Mauricie, Quebec, Canada
 Bostonnais River, La Tuque (City), Mauricie, Quebec, Canada
 La Bostonnais, Quebec (municipality), La Tuque, Mauricie, Quebec, Canada
 Grand Lake Bostonnais, La Tuque (urban agglomeration), Mauricie, Quebec, Canada
 Grand River Bostonnais (Portneuf), Portneuf Regional County Municipality, National Capitale Region, Quebec, Canada

Other uses
 Jean-Baptiste Bostonnais, a trapper Abenaki, namesake of La Bostonnais, Quebec